Pyxidanthera brevifolia, the littleleaf pixiemoss or sandhills pyxie-moss, is a plant species known only from North Carolina and South Carolina.

Pyxidanthera brevifolia is closely related to the more widespread P. barbulata, and some authors have suggested considering the two as a single species. For the moment, though, Flora of North America and the Kew Gardens Plant List  both accept P. brevifolia as a distinct species. The two can be distinguished by the leaves. They also lack the marginal cilia characteristic of P. barbulata, and are more intensely woolly on the underside.

References

Diapensiaceae
Flora of North Carolina
Flora of South Carolina